Val d'Oust (literally Vale of Oust) is a commune in the Morbihan department of western France, named after the river Oust. Le Roc-Saint-André is the municipal seat. The municipality was established on 1 January 2016 and consists of the former communes of Le Roc-Saint-André, Quily and La Chapelle-Caro.

See also 
Communes of the Morbihan department

References 

Valdoust

Communes nouvelles of Morbihan
Populated places established in 2016
2016 establishments in France